Zuzana Hagarová (born 25 November 1977 in Kežmarok) is a Slovak chess player who holds the title of the FIDE titles of International Master (IM) and Woman Grandmaster (WGM).

Chess career
In 1993 Hagarová won the championship in Slovak Girls' Championship (U16). Many times she participated in the European Youth Chess Championships and World Youth Chess Championships in various age categories. She achieved her greatest success in 1994 when she won the title of vice-champion of the World Girls' Championship (U18) in Szeged.

Hagarová has played for Slovakia in nine Chess Olympiads (1994-2008, 2014) and four European Team Chess Championships (1997-2003), where she won team gold in 1999.

She has successfully participated in many international chess tournaments. In 2004, she shared 2nd place in the Tatry Open 2004 with Ján Plachetka and Martin Mrva. In 2008, she shared 2nd place in the Slovakia Open championship in Zvolen. In 2013, she won the Riga Technical University Open's best woman's prize.

References

External links

Zuzana Hagarová chess games at 365Chess.com

1977 births
Living people
Chess International Masters
Chess woman grandmasters
Slovak female chess players
People from Kežmarok
Sportspeople from the Prešov Region
Chess Olympiad competitors